Jacob Schram  (born 1962) is a Norwegian executive and former CEO of Norwegian Air Shuttle, Europe's third largest low-cost airline.

Biography 
Before Norwegian Air Shuttle, Jacob Schram worked for McKinsey & Company and McDonald's. Then, he held executive positions at Circle K and Statoil Fuel & Retail.

Between December 2018 and December 2019, he is Advisor at Antler, a global startup generator.

Jacob Schram has a Master of Science in Strategy from Copenhagen Business School.

Bibliography 
 The Essence of Business, Jacob Schram, Dinamo Forlag AS, May 2017,

Award 
 NACS European Industry Leader of the Year, 2017

References

Place of birth missing (living people)
Living people
Norwegian airline chief executives
Norwegian Air Shuttle
Copenhagen Business School alumni
1962 births